Mariann Mayberry (May 25, 1965 – August 1, 2017) was an American television and stage actress.

Biography
In 1993, Mayberry became an ensemble member of the Steppenwolf Theatre Company in Chicago, Illinois. While at Steppenwolf, she was nominated for a Joseph Jefferson Award for Actress in a Supporting Role in a Play for Time of My Life, and again for Actress in a Principal Role in a Play for Hysteria, directed by John Malkovich.

In 2006, Mayberry married fellow actor Scott Jaeck, with whom she shared the stage in the Broadway run of Tracy Letts' Tony Award- and Pulitzer Prize-winning play August: Osage County.

Later years and death
In early 2013, Mayberry was diagnosed with ovarian cancer.

In August 2015, after a run of Grand Concourse, Mayberry retired from the stage. On August 1, 2017, aged 52, Mayberry died of ovarian cancer at her sister (Melissa Hollander)'s home in Simsbury, Connecticut. At the time, Mayberry lived in New York with her husband of 11 years, actor Scott Jaeck.

The Steppenwolf Theatre cancelled that night's show as a gesture of respect.

Filmography
 Under the Influence (1994)
 Tangled (1997) as JC
 Since You've Been Gone (1998) (TV) as Chelsea Trotman
 Law & Order: Special Victims Unit as Candy Forrester (1 episode, 2002)
 The Pennsylvania Miners' Story (2002) (TV) as Cathy Hileman
 The Company (2003) as stepmother
 Life Sentence (2004) as Maddie
 War of the Worlds (2005) as mother
 Kubuku Rides (This Is It) (2006) as bar maid
 Law & Order: Criminal Intent (2006) as Monica Corbett
 Delocated as therapist (1 episode, 2009)
 Handsome Harry (2009) as Judy Rheems
 Dogman (2012) as wife
 Dogman 2 (2013) as wife
 Blue Bloods (2015) in the episode 'Sins of the Father' (Season 5 - Episode 10) as Janice Phillips, the mother

Theatre

Steppenwolf Theatre Company
 The Geography of Luck (1989)
 Wrong Turn at Lungfish (1990)
 Ghost in the Machine (1993)
 Time of My Life (1995)
 As I Lay Dying (1995)
 Slavs! (1995)
 Everyman (A Moral Play) (1995)
 The Libertine (1996)
 Time to Burn (1997)
 Space (1997)
 A Fair Country (1998)
 The Berlin Circle (1998)
 Hysteria (1999)
 One Flew Over the Cuckoo's Nest (2000)
 Cross-Town Traffic (2000)
 David Copperfield (2001)
 Wendall Greene (2002)
 The Pain and the Itch (2005)
 Last of the Boys (2005)
 Love Song (2006)
 The Diary of Anne Frank (2007)
 August: Osage County (2007)
 Good People (2012)
  The MArch (2012).... Mattie
  Grand Concourse (2015)

Other
 The Notebooks of Leonardo Da Vinci, Goodman Theatre
 The Odyssey, Goodman Theatre
 Mirror of the Invisible World, Goodman Theatre
 How I Learned to Drive, Northlight Theater and Alliance Theatre
 Metamorphoses, Lookingglass Theatre
 Argonautika, Lookingglass Theatre
 The Master and Margarita, Lookingglass Theatre
 Proof, Virginia Stage Company
 The Time of Your Life, Seattle and San Francisco Theatres

References

External links
 Mariann Mayberry profile, steppenwolf.org; accessed October 14, 2017.
 
 
 

1965 births
2017 deaths
Actresses from Missouri
American stage actresses
American television actresses
People from Springfield, Missouri
Steppenwolf Theatre Company players
Deaths from ovarian cancer
Deaths from cancer in Connecticut
21st-century American women